Lefortovo may refer to:
Lefortovo District, a district in South-Eastern Administrative Okrug of Moscow, Russia
Lefortovo Prison, a prison in Moscow, Russia
Lefortovo Tunnel, a road tunnel in Moscow, Russia
Lefortovo Hill, one of the seven hills of Moscow, Russia
Lefortovo (Moscow Metro), a station on the Moscow Metro